Edward Harper (10 December 1883 – 24 April 1939) was an Australian rules footballer who played with Collingwood in the Victorian Football League (VFL).

Notes

External links 

Ned Harper's profile at Collingwood Forever

1883 births
1939 deaths
Australian rules footballers from Victoria (Australia)
Collingwood Football Club players